Douglas Reed Ellin (born April 6, 1968) is an American podcaster, screenwriter and film and TV director, known best for creating the HBO television series Entourage. Ellin also served as executive producer, director, head writer and supporting actor for the series, and wrote, directed and produced its 2015 film adaptation. He attended Tulane University.

Life and career
Ellin was born in Brooklyn, New York, the son of June and Marvin Ellin.  He grew up in Merrick, New York and graduated from John F. Kennedy High School (Bellmore, New York).

Ellin is of Jewish descent. 

Before producing and writing for Entourage, Ellin served as a staff writer for Life with Bonnie, which starred Bonnie Hunt. The series ran from 2003-2004. Ellin has also written screenplays for two films, Kissing a Fool and Phat Beach. He moved to Los Angeles in the early 1990s to be a stand-up comedian and soon got a job in the mail room at New Line Cinema. It was there where he befriended film producer Mike DeLuca who funded Ellin's first short film The Pitch, starring then unknown actor David Schwimmer. That short film got Ellin accepted to the American Film Institute, where he graduated from in 1994. In 1996, he directed the independent comedy film Phat Beach. The film was made on a very low budget, and Ellin has called it "Probably the worst movie ever made". Two years later, Ellin made another independent comedy film Kissing a Fool, starring David Schwimmer, who was now known due to his role on Friends which was in its fourth season.

Kissing a Fool was sold for distribution and Ellin subsequently sold a few screenplays to Miramax. One, The Pledge was never produced although Ellin was paid seven figures for the script and was set to direct. He sold another unproduced screenplay for mid-six figures.

Ellin's real success came in 2004 with Entourage. The HBO show ran for eight seasons and Ellin made an eight-figure pact with HBO to continue producing television.

Additionally, Ellin serves on the board of the Greenwich International Film Festival.

Ellin wrote and directed the 2015 film adaptation of Entourage.

Ellin is currently one of the co-hosts to the “Victory!” podcast, which was created and produced by Action Park media.

Awards and nominations
Ellin has been nominated for three Emmy Awards, four Writers Guild of America Awards, three PGA Awards and a BAFTA, and has won a BAFTA and a PGA award.

Personal life
Ellin graduated from Tulane University in the liberal arts. Ellin married Melissa Dana Hecht in 1996 and together have two children. The two divorced in 2009. Ellin has said the character of Ari Gold's wife in Entourage was based on Hecht.

Ellin dated Maddie Diehl and proposed to her in 2014, but the couple broke up in March 2016.

Ellin married Andrea Adler in September 2017 and filed for divorce shortly thereafter in April 2018.

Filmography

References

External links
 

1968 births
AFI Conservatory alumni
American male screenwriters
Television producers from New York City
American television writers
BAFTA winners (people)
Living people
Tulane University alumni
Showrunners
Writers from Brooklyn
People from Merrick, New York
American male television writers
Screenwriters from New York (state)
John F. Kennedy High School (Bellmore, New York) alumni